Indianapolis Downtown Heliport is a heliport located in the city center of Indianapolis. The heliport was opened in 1969 as a private use heliport under the name Beeline Heliport and, in 1979, was turned into a public facility operated by the Indianapolis Airport Authority (IAA). In 1983, the FAA picked the heliport to be part of its National Prototype Demonstration Heliport Program, a project launched to illustrate the usefulness and viability of full-service downtown heliports in the United States, and as a result it received considerable funding for improvements and expansion. It currently has one main pad for landing, an apron, and two hangars. IFR approaches are possible.

In mid-2020, the IAA submitted a request to the city of Indianapolis to approve the closing of the heliport, stating that the financial burden of operating the facility was greater than the public value derived from it. In December of that year, the IAA made a formal request to the Federal Aviation Administration for the closure. The IAA is working with the last tenant of the helipad, Indiana University Health's LifeLine, to find a new location for LifeLine's helicopters. Upon closure, the  site will be sold for commercial development.

References

External links

Indianapolis Downtown Heliport

Airports in Indiana
Transportation in Indianapolis
Transportation buildings and structures in Marion County, Indiana
1969 establishments in the United States